Scheels Arena (formerly called The Urban Plains Center, or UPC) is a multi-purpose venue located in Fargo, North Dakota. It is part of the Sanford Health Athletic Park which comprises the arena, the Family Wellness Center (a partnership between Sanford Health and the YMCA), and the Sanford POWER Athletic Center.  There are plans to add four additional ice sheets.

History
The Urban Plains Center was constructed and opened in 2008. Before opening, the concrete foundation of the Arena was vandalized causing roughly $500,000 worth of damage and leading to 3 criminal arrests. It was renamed in 2010 after Scheels All Sports purchased the naming rights. The arena seats up to 6,000 for concerts, over 5,000 for ice hockey, and it holds 40 suites and 300 club seats. It features an NHL-sized ice sheet. The main tenant of the arena is the Fargo Force, who play in the United States Hockey League.

Events

Other arena events have included Fargo-Moorhead high school hockey, the 2009 IIHF World U18 Championships, the 2011 US Curling Nationals for both men and women, the 2014 United States Olympic Curling Trials, the 2015 NCAA Men's Division I Ice Hockey Tournament West Regional, rodeos, and concerts.

The North Dakota State Bison men's basketball team played their home games at Scheels Arena for the 2014–15 and 2015–16 seasons while their previous arena, the Bison Sports Arena, was being remodeled.

In February 2016 the Arena hosted the funeral of slain Fargo Police Officer Jason David Moszer. An estimated 3,600 people were in attendance with an estimated 2,800 being law enforcement.

In June 2018 President Donald J Trump held a rally at the Scheels Arena where he campaigned on behalf of Kevin Cramer and Kelly Armstrong.  Trump spoke to an arena filled to capacity (6000 people) with supporters and protesters outside of the arena.

Concerts
Skillet 2010
Red 2010
Nelly 2011
Wiz Khalifa 2012
Florida Georgia Line
Third Day 2013
Newsboys 2016
Lynyrd Skynyrd 2017
Tech N9NE 2018
Toby Keith 2018
Kip Moore 2018
Rascal Flatts 2018
Kelsea Ballerini 2019
Styx 2019
REO Speedwagon 2019
Justin Moore 2020
For King & Country 2021
Carrie Underwood 2022

References

External links
Scheels Arena website

Indoor ice hockey venues in the United States
Indoor arenas in North Dakota
Buildings and structures in Fargo, North Dakota
2008 establishments in North Dakota
Sports venues completed in 2008
Defunct college basketball venues in the United States
Basketball venues in North Dakota
Curling venues in the United States
Rodeo venues in the United States